Brennen Ray Jones (born April 25, 1987) is a Canadian curler from Regina, Saskatchewan. He is a two-time provincial junior champion.

In 2006, playing third for Mitch Heidt, Jones won his first provincial junior championship qualifying him for the 2006 Canadian Junior Curling Championships. Saskatchewan missed the playoffs, finishing with a 7–5 round robin record.

In 2008, Jones skipped his own team to his second provincial junior championship. His Saskatchewan rink finished the round robin at the 2008 Canadian Junior Curling Championships with a 9–3 record. This put him in a tie-breaker against Ontario (skipped by Travis Fanset) which he lost.

From 2007 to 2009, outside junior competition, Jones played second for Brad Heidt in numerous World Curling Tour events. Jones left to form his own team before joining Pat Simmons' team in 2010. He played in his first Brier in 2011.

Personal life
Jones is married and has two children. He works as a claims construction specialist with SGI Canada.

References

1987 births
Living people
Curlers from Regina, Saskatchewan
Sportspeople from Weyburn
Canadian male curlers
Canada Cup (curling) participants